This is a list of gym chains by country. Some gyms may have the same name but in fact be unrelated. This is a list of generally corporate-owned or franchised gyms operating worldwide.

Africa

Egypt
 Gold's Gym
 Snap Fitness

South Africa
 Virgin Active

Namibia
 Virgin Active

Americas

Brazil
 Bio Ritmo

Canada
 Anytime Fitness
 Gold's Gym
 GoodLife Fitness
 LA Fitness
 Planet Fitness
 Snap Fitness
 World Gym
 Crunch Fitness
 24 Hour Fitness

Chile
 Hard Candy Fitness - Santiago

Costa Rica
 Gold's Gym

Dominican Republic
 Gold's Gym
 Planet Fitness

Ecuador
 Gold's Gym

Mexico
 Gold's Gym
 Hard Candy Fitness - Mexico City
 Snap Fitness
 World Gym - Querétaro
 Planet Fitness

Peru
 Gold's Gym

United States
 24 Hour Fitness 
 Anytime Fitness 
 Crunch Fitness
 Curves International
 Equinox Fitness
 F45 Training
 Gold's Gym
 LA Fitness 
 Lifetime Fitness
 Orangetheory Fitness
 Planet Fitness
 Snap Fitness
 Town Sports International
 Youfit

Asia

Hong Kong
Anytime Fitness
Fitness First

India
 Anytime Fitness
 Fitness First
 Gold's Gym
 Snap Fitness
 Talwalkars

Indonesia
 Celebrity Fitness
 Fitness First
 Gold's Gym
 Anytime Fitness

Japan 
 Anytime Fitness
 Gunze Sports (ja)

Kuwait 
 Gold's Gym

Malaysia
 Anytime Fitness
 Celebrity Fitness
 Fitness First

Philippines
 Anytime Fitness
 Fitness First
 Gold's Gym
 Snap Fitness

Saudi Arabia
 Fitness First
 Gold's Gym

Singapore
 Anytime Fitness
 Celebrity Fitness

Taiwan
World Gym

Thailand
 Anytime Fitness
 Fitness First
 Jetts Fitness - Bangkok
 Virgin Active

United Arab Emirates
 Fitness First

Europe

Germany
 Fitness First
 Hard Candy Fitness
 McFit

Ireland 
 Anytime Fitness 
 Ben Dunne Gyms
 West Wood Club

Italy
 Hard Candy Fitness - Rome and Milan

Netherlands
 Gold's Gym
 Jetts Fitness

Russia
 Gold's Gym
 Hard Candy Fitness - Moscow and St Petersburg
 World Gym

Nordic countries 
 Elixia

United Kingdom
 Anytime Fitness
 Bannatyne's
 Ben Dunne Gyms 
 David Lloyd Leisure
 DW Sports Fitness
 Energie Group Gyms 
 F45 Training
 Fitness First
 Gold's Gym
 The Gym Group 
 JD Sports Gym 
 Jetts Fitness
 Nuffield Health 
 Places for People
 PureGym 
 Snap Fitness
 Sports Direct Fitness Gyms 
 Total Fitness
 Village Hotel Club 
 Virgin Active

Oceania

Australia
 Anytime Fitness
 Crunch Fitness
 EFM Health Clubs
 F45 Training
 Fitness First
 Gold's Gym
 Goodlife Health Clubs
 Hard Candy Fitness
 Hypoxi
 Jetts Fitness
 Les Mills International
 Snap Fitness
 Virgin Active
 World Gym

New Zealand
 Anytime Fitness
 F45 Training
 Jetts Fitness
 Les Mills International
 Snap Fitness

Defunct chains
 Bally Total Fitness
 California Fitness
 Esporta Health Clubs

References

Health clubs
Health club